Zizar (also Romanized as Zīzār, Zī Zār, Zaizar, Zāy Zār, and Zāyzār) is a village in Khvormuj Rural District, in the Central District of Dashti County, Bushehr Province, Iran. At the 2006 census, its population was 121, in 27 families.

References 

Populated places in Dashti County